Bhai is a Pakistani drama serial. It is aired by A-Plus Entertainment in Urdu language. It features Nauman Ijaz as a headstrong and troublemaker councillor of the mahallah for everyone be in the house or outside, with Affan Waheed and Maha Warsi in leading roles.

Plot 
The story revolves around the dominance of man in eastern culture. A man with power is destroying the life of his innocent siblings' relations and when falls himself in love, considers love as legal.

Cast 

 Noman Ijaz as Ashraf “Bhai”; the arrogant, dominated protagonist and Hammad's elder brother
 Affan Waheed as Hammad; Ashraf's younger brother
 Maha Warsi as Ifrah; a teacher lives in the neighborhood of Ashraf and Hammad's love interest
 Saboor Aly as Sairah; Ashraf and Hammad's younger sister
 Seemi Raheel as Shakeela; Ashraf and Hammad's mother
 Salman Shahid as Muneer; Ashraf and Hammad's father
 Qaiser Naqvi
 Maryam Noor as Hira 
 Azra Aftab
 Kinza Malik as Sajida	
 Adnan Shah Tipu
 Munazzah Arif as Sabiha

References

External links 
 Official website

A-Plus TV original programming
Pakistani drama television series